"Flowers on a Grave" is a song by British rock band Bush. It was released as the second single from their eighth album The Kingdom on 4 March 2020.

Content

Style 
"Flowers on a Grave" was detailed by Blabbermouth to be a "hard-charging lead track". The song is based around electronic undercurrents and heavy guitar textures.

Lyrics 
Gavin Rossdale explained to Louder Sound that "Flowers on a Grave" was "a song about getting to know yourself", and opined that the track "has really found a way to connect with people during this pandemic".

Reception 
"Flowers on a Grave" was featured on Loudwire's list "66 Best Rock Songs of 2020".

Chart

References

2020 singles
Bush (British band) songs
2020 songs
Songs written by Gavin Rossdale